Central constituency (No.98) is a Russian legislative constituency in Kaliningrad Oblast. Between 1993 and 2007 Kaliningrad Oblast had only one constituency, but population growth provided the oblast with second constituency.

Members elected

Results

2016

|-
! colspan=2 style="background-color:#E9E9E9;text-align:left;vertical-align:top;" |Candidate
! style="background-color:#E9E9E9;text-align:left;vertical-align:top;" |Party
! style="background-color:#E9E9E9;text-align:right;" |Votes
! style="background-color:#E9E9E9;text-align:right;" |%
|-
|style="background-color:"|
|align=left|Aleksey Silanov
|align=left|United Russia
|
|40.78%
|-
|style="background-color:"|
|align=left|Yevgeny Mishin
|align=left|Liberal Democratic Party
|
|11.06%
|-
|style="background-color:"|
|align=left|Igor Pleshkov
|align=left|Communist Party
|
|10.55%
|-
|style="background:"| 
|align=left|Solomon Ginzburg
|align=left|Party of Growth
|
|10.07%
|-
|style="background:"| 
|align=left|Pavel Fedorov
|align=left|A Just Russia
|
|7.53%
|-
|style="background:"| 
|align=left|Maksim Pavlenko
|align=left|Communists of Russia
|
|4.43%
|-
|style="background: "| 
|align=left|Lyudmila Poplavskaya
|align=left|The Greens
|
|4.24%
|-
|style="background-color:"|
|align=left|Yury Galanin
|align=left|Rodina
|
|3.61%
|-
|style="background:"| 
|align=left|Sergey Malikov
|align=left|Civic Platform
|
|1.52%
|-
| colspan="5" style="background-color:#E9E9E9;"|
|- style="font-weight:bold"
| colspan="3" style="text-align:left;" | Total
| 
| 100%
|-
| colspan="5" style="background-color:#E9E9E9;"|
|- style="font-weight:bold"
| colspan="4" |Source:
|
|}

2018

|-
! colspan=2 style="background-color:#E9E9E9;text-align:left;vertical-align:top;" |Candidate
! style="background-color:#E9E9E9;text-align:left;vertical-align:top;" |Party
! style="background-color:#E9E9E9;text-align:right;" |Votes
! style="background-color:#E9E9E9;text-align:right;" |%
|-
|style="background-color:"|
|align=left|Aleksandr Yaroshuk
|align=left|United Russia
|32,185
|39.87%
|-
| style="background-color: " |
|align=left|Igor Revin
|align=left|Communist Party
|18,206
|22.55%
|-
| style="background-color: " |
|align=left|Yevgeny Mishin
|align=left|Liberal Democratic Party
|11,023
|13.65%
|-
| style="background-color: " |
|align=left|Olga Kuzemskaya
|align=left|Party of Pensioners
|5,538
|6.86%
|-
| style="background-color: " |
|align=left|Konstantin Doroshok
|align=left|A Just Russia
|5,212
|6.46%
|-
| style="background-color: " |
|align=left|Aleksandr Orlov
|align=left|Communists of Russia
|4,408
|5.46%
|-
| colspan="5" style="background-color:#E9E9E9;" |
|- style="font-weight:bold"
| colspan="3" style="text-align:left;" |Total
|80,729
|100%
|-
| colspan="5" style="background-color:#E9E9E9;" |
|- style="font-weight:bold"
| colspan="4" |Source:
|
|}

2021

|-
! colspan=2 style="background-color:#E9E9E9;text-align:left;vertical-align:top;" |Candidate
! style="background-color:#E9E9E9;text-align:left;vertical-align:top;" |Party
! style="background-color:#E9E9E9;text-align:right;" |Votes
! style="background-color:#E9E9E9;text-align:right;" |%
|-
|style="background-color:"|
|align=left|Marina Orgeyeva
|align=left|United Russia
|79,639
|39.77%
|-
|style="background-color:"|
|align=left|Darya Anuchina
|align=left|Communist Party
|29,685
|14.83%
|-
|style="background-color:"|
|align=left|Yevgeny Mishin
|align=left|Liberal Democratic Party
|21,096
|10.54%
|-
|style="background-color: " |
|align=left|Yury Shitikov
|align=left|A Just Russia — For Truth
|14,881
|7.43%
|-
|style="background-color: "|
|align=left|Tamara Bragina
|align=left|Party of Pensioners
|11,382
|5.68%
|-
|style="background-color:"|
|align=left|Yekaterina Semyonova
|align=left|New People
|11,325
|5.66%
|-
|style="background-color:"|
|align=left|Natalya Konovalova
|align=left|Communists of Russia
|8,134
|4.06%
|-
|style="background-color:"|
|align=left|Dmitry Novik
|align=left|Rodina
|4,880
|2.44%
|-
|style="background-color:"|
|align=left|Igor Pleshkov
|align=left|Yabloko
|4,405
|2.20%
|-
|style="background:"| 
|align=left|Vladimir Timofeyev
|align=left|Party of Freedom and Justice
|3,712
|1.85%
|-
| colspan="5" style="background-color:#E9E9E9;"|
|- style="font-weight:bold"
| colspan="3" style="text-align:left;" | Total
| 200,226
| 100%
|-
| colspan="5" style="background-color:#E9E9E9;"|
|- style="font-weight:bold"
| colspan="4" |Source:
|
|}

References

Notes

See also 

 Politics of Kaliningrad Oblast

Politics of Kaliningrad Oblast
Russian legislative constituencies